The 1931 Prussian Landtag referendum was a referendum to dissolve the Prussian Landtag or parliament held on the initiative of Der Stahlhelm ex-servicemen's organisation with the support of the Nazi Party and the German Communist Party.

The referendum was held on 9 August 1931 and required 13.2 million votes to succeed. However,  the referendum only gained 9.8 million votes, and thus failed.

References

1931
Politics of Free State of Prussia
1931 referendums
1931 elections in Germany